Danville Mountain is a mountain in Warren County, New Jersey. It is part of the New York–New Jersey Highlands of the Appalachian Mountains, although somewhat isolated to the west of the main body of the Highlands.

References 

Mountains of Warren County, New Jersey
Mountains of New Jersey